The Montreal City Council is the governing body in the mayor–council government in the city of Montreal, Quebec. The head of the city government in Montreal is the mayor, who is first among equals in the city council. The council is a democratically elected institution and is the final decision-making authority in the city, although much power is centralized in the executive committee. The council consists of 65 members from all boroughs of the city. The council has jurisdiction over many matters, including public security, agreements with other governments, subsidy programs, the environment, urban planning, and a three-year capital expenditure program. The city council is also required to supervise, standardize or approve certain decisions made by the borough councils.

City Hall

 Shed near Pointe à Callière 1642 – as town hall
 Château Maisonneuve ??
 Palais de l'Intendance 1698–1713?
 Château Ramezay 1760–1774
 Maison Beaujeu (320 Notre Dame)
 Bonsecours Market – home to city hall and council from 1852 to 1878
 Old Montreal Courthouse (now Édifice Lucien-Saulnier) 1922–1926, 2019–present
 Montreal City Hall – 1878–1922; 1926–2019 (closed for renovations until 2022)

Committees 

Reporting directly to the city council, the executive committee exercises decision-making powers similar to that of the cabinet in a parliamentary system and is responsible for preparing various documents including budgets and by-laws, submitted to the city council for approval. The decision-making powers of the executive committee cover, in particular, the awarding of contracts or grants, the management of human and financial resources, supplies and buildings. It may also be assigned further powers by the city council.

Standing committees are the council's prime instruments for public consultation. They are responsible for the public study of pending matters and for making the appropriate recommendations to the council. They also review the annual budget forecasts for departments under their jurisdiction. A public notice of meeting is published in both French and English daily newspapers at least seven days before each meeting. All meetings include a public question period. The standing committees, of which there are seven, have terms lasting two years. In addition, the city council may decide to create special committees at any time. Each standing committee is made up of seven to nine members, including a chairman and a vice-chairman. The members are all elected municipal officers, with the exception of a representative of the government of Quebec on the public security committee.

Composition

The current city council consists of the mayor and 64 elected city councillors, including borough mayors. Unlike most Canadian cities, the city of Montreal has political parties; however, these are not chapters of any federal or provincial political parties, but are standalone entities at the municipal level.

Each borough is divided into between two and five districts, and has a different system of representation depending on its population. Each borough also has a five-member borough council, consisting of the borough mayor, any city councillors, and in certain boroughs additional borough councillors, as follows:

Party standings

The most recent election was the 2021 Montreal municipal election, in which Valérie Plante's Projet Montréal won 37 out of 65 available seats.

Changes since 5 November 2017 election

 20 November 2017: Jean-François Parenteau, borough mayor of Verdun, leaves Équipe Denis Coderre to sit as an independent, upon taking a position on the executive council.
 11 January 2018: Équipe Denis Coderre takes on the name Ensemble Montréal.
 26 April 2018: Hadrien Parizeau, city councillor for the district of Saint-Sulpice, is expelled from Ensemble Montréal and sits as an independent.
 3 August 2018: Villeray–Saint-Michel–Parc-Extension borough mayor Giuliana Fumagalli is expelled from Projet Montréal and sits as an independent.
 17 August 2018: Renée-Chantal Belinga, borough councillor for the district of Ovide-Clermont, leaves Ensemble Montréal and sits as an independent.
 1 October 2018: Chantal Rouleau, borough mayor of Rivière-des-Prairies–Pointe-aux-Trembles, and Frantz Benjamin, city councillor for the district of Saint-Michel, leave the city council upon being elected to the National Assembly of Quebec.
 12 October 2018: Giovanni Rapanà, city councillor for the district of Rivière-des-Prairies, leaves Ensemble Montréal to sit as an independent.
 20 October 2018: Marie-Josée Parent, city councillor for the district of Champlain–L'Île-des-Sœurs, leaves Ensemble Montréal to join Projet Montréal.
 16 December 2018: In two by-elections, Caroline Bourgeois of Projet Montréal is elected borough mayor of Rivière-des-Prairies–Pointe-aux-Trembles, and Josué Corvil of Ensemble Montréal is elected city councillor for Saint-Michel.
 11 January 2019: Marvin Rotrand, city councillor for Snowdon, the only member of Coalition Montréal on the council, announces that he will sit as an independent.
 27 March 2019: Lynne Shand, borough councillor for the district of Anjou West, is expelled from Équipe Anjou and sits as an independent.
 9 April 2019: Cathy Wong, speaker of the city council and city councillor for the district of Peter-McGill, leaves Ensemble Montréal and sits as an independent.
 14 May 2019: Luc Ferrandez, borough mayor of Le Plateau-Mont-Royal, resigns.
 3 October 2019: Cathy Wong, speaker of the city council and city councillor for the district of Peter-McGill, sitting as an independent, joins Projet Montréal.
 7 October 2019: Luc Rabouin of Projet Montréal is elected in a by-election to serve as borough mayor of Le Plateau-Mont-Royal, succeeding Luc Ferrandez.
 21 October 2019: Patricia Lattanzio, city councillor for the district of Saint-Léonard-Est, leave the city council upon being elected to the House of Commons of Canada.
 24 January 2020: Sue Montgomery, borough mayor of Côte-des-Neiges—Notre-Dame-de-Grâce, is expelled from the Projet Montréal caucus after refusing to fire a member of her staff that had been accused of psychological harassment. She sits as an independent.
 23 October 2020: Julie-Pascale Provost, borough councillor for the district of Du Canal, is expelled from Projet Montréal and sits as an independent.
 9 December 2020: Christian Arseneault, city councillor for the district of Loyola, leaves Projet Montréal and sits as an independent.
 17 December 2020: Christine Gosselin, city councillor for the district of Vieux-Rosemont, leaves Projet Montréal and sits as an independent.
26 January 2021: Giuliana Fumagalli, borough mayor for the borough of Villeray–Saint-Michel–Parc-Extension, sitting as an independent, creates a new party, Quartiers Montréal.
 11 March 2021: Sue Montgomery, borough mayor of Côte-des-Neiges—Notre-Dame-de-Grâce, sitting as an independent, creates a new party, Courage - Équipe Sue Montgomery.
 17 March 2021: Jean-Marc Corbeil, borough councillor for the district of Robert-Bourassa, is expelled from Ensemble Montréal and sits as an independent.
 21 April 2021: Hadrien Parizeau, city councillor for the district of Saint-Sulpice, sitting as an independent, joins back Ensemble Montréal.
 4 June 2021: Julie-Pascale Provost, borough councillor for the district of Du Canal, sitting as an independent, joins Ensemble Montréal.
 16 June 2021: Marvin Rotrand, city councillor for the district of Snowdon, sitting as an independent, joins Ensemble Montréal.
 18 June 2021: Giovanni Rapanà, city councillor for the district of Rivière-des-Prairies, sitting as an independent, joins back Ensemble Montréal.
 13 July 2021: Véronique Tremblay, borough councillor for the district of Champlain–L'Île-des-Sœurs, leaves Ensemble Montréal to join Projet Montréal.
 16 August 2021: Christian Arseneault, city councillor for the district of Loyola, announces his resignation.

Changes since 7 November 2021 election
 7 November 2021: Even though he was elected under the Projet Montréal label, Craig Sauvé announced he would sit as independent.
 10 February 2022: Serge Sasseville, city councillor for the district of Peter-McGill, leaves Ensemble Montréal to sit as an independent.

Current members

See the members of the Montreal Executive Committee

Notes

References

External links
 List of city and borough councillors. Ville de Montréal.

Municipal councils in Quebec
Municipal government of Montreal